Joazhifel Soares da Cruz Sousa Pontes (born 19 January 1991), commonly known as Jocy, is a São Toméan footballer who plays as a midfielder for UD Rei Amador and the São Tomé and Príncipe national team.

Biography
Jocy was born in the capital city of São Tomé.

Jocy started to play at football championship competitions, first with Vitória FC in 2011 which was the club's successful season then Sporting Praia Cruz in 2013 where he currently plays. He returned to Vitória Riboque in 2014 and was number 30.

International goals

References

1991 births
Living people
Association football midfielders
São Tomé and Príncipe footballers
People from São Tomé
São Tomé and Príncipe international footballers
Vitória FC Riboque players
Sporting Praia Cruz players
UDRA players